Bilateral relations between the Russian Federation's predecessor the Union of Soviet Socialist Republics and the Republic of China were established from 1922 until 1949 when it switched to the recognition of the People's Republic of China (and in the same year the ROC established diplomatic relations with South Korea).

Past relations

As a result of the Shimonoseki Treaty in 1895, which ended the Sino-Japanese War, Taiwan was transferred to Japan and was promptly made a Japanese colony. Foreign consulates resumed their activities on Formosa, 2 including Russian activities in 1896. The first Russian consul was the German native Paul Shabert. Both the Republic of China and the Soviet Union were the founding members of the United Nations and the Security Council in 1945.

After the end of the Korean War in 1954, the US signed a security treaty with the government of the Republic of China, which included a clause providing for American participation in military action in case of confrontation with mainland China. The Soviet Union minister of foreign affairs in a statement called the treaty a “rude violation of international agreements, sovereignty, and the territorial integrity of the PRC.”

All contact between the USSR and the Republic of China defined by the Sino-Soviet Treaty of Friendship and Alliance of 1945 was broken off. The announcement of the breakup was made on October 3, 1949 after the Soviet Union became the first country to recognize the PRC in October.

Although there have been some weak tendencies towards change in the status quo since the late 1950s, up to this day, the Russian Federation has had no official relations with Taiwan. It is worth mentioning that the USSR had always adhered to the policy of “one China” but insisted on a political solution to deal with the crisis. Possibly, it was one of the reasons for the cooling of Sino Soviet relations at the end of the 1950s. When in September 1954 bombardment of the Taiwan-adjacent islands provoked the first of the three Matszu-Amoi crises, the Soviet Union in Nikita Khrushchev’s statement officially announced its support of the PRC. At the same time, Foreign Minister Vyacheslav Molotov expressed concern that the regional conflict would turn into a major war, while accusing the United States of provoking the conflict. Not long before the crisis in 1954, ROC Navy captured a Soviet civilian oil tanker “Tuapse” in the high sea of Bashi Channel, which was on course from Odessa to Vladivostok. 49 crew were detained, whereas 29 were released in 1955, 9 moved to US and the others were imprisoned in various time frames till either died or finally released after 34 years in 1988. The Communist Party of the Soviet Union called for the Ten Nations Summit in New Delhi to discuss the issue on 27 September 1958 as one of the precursors of the later Sino-Soviet split.

Unofficial contact between the USSR and Taiwan started at the end of the 1960s such as the visits between Victor Louis, Chiang Ching-kuo and James Wei, after the tendency toward a US-PRC rapprochement had become obvious. It is well known that the visits by Richard Nixon and Henry Kissinger resulted in the signing of the so-called Shanghai communiqué in 1972 when it was declared that the US “acknowledges that all Chinese on either side of the Taiwan Strait maintain there is but one China and that Taiwan is a part of China.” Meanwhile, Taiwan hoped that a Soviet-Taiwanese rapprochement would prevent the rising number of China-American contacts. It is possible that the USSR in its turn considered that restoration of relations with the ROC would help to slow down the aggravation in Soviet-PRC relations. Taiwan was eager to compromise since after the weakening of its relations with the US, it had little to lose. The Soviet Union, however, was very careful in its policy towards the ROC, trading with it via Hong Kong, Japan, West Germany, and its Eastern European allies.

Present day relations
The ROC representative office in Russia, the Representative Office in Moscow for the Taipei-Moscow Economic and Cultural Coordination Commission, was opened on 12 July 1993 by the Ministry of Foreign Affairs of the ROC. The Russian representative office in Taiwan, Representative Office in Taipei for the Moscow-Taipei Coordination Commission on Economic and Cultural Cooperation, was opened on 15 December 1996 by the Ministry of Foreign Affairs of Russia.

By 2002, the borders of Outer Mongolia were eliminated from the ROC boundary definition in which the Tuva Republic was incorporated in. 

In 2005, the total amount of the trade between the two countries (in US dollars) was 2,188,944,473. As can be seen from the data, Russia keeps a positive balance in its trade relations with Taiwan thanks to crude oil, cast iron and steel, nonferrous metals, petrochemical products, ferro-alloys, coking coal, timber, and chemical fertilizers. Russia imports mostly electronics and electronic parts, computers and computer parts, and home appliances.

The negative trade balance ($1.68 billion in 2005) issue is taken seriously in Taiwan. However, the prevalence of natural resources in Russian exports and industrial products in Taiwan are considered in Taiwan to be logical at the present stage of relations. To improve the situation, it is recommended to increase the export of Taiwanese products to Russia. The relatively low level of Taiwanese exports to Russia can be explained by several factors. Firstly, the price of Taiwanese products is still quite high for most Russian consumers, the rest prefer high-end European, American, or Japanese products. Secondly, there are difficulties and complexities involved in bank transfers, which are mostly conducted through third countries. Thirdly, there is insufficient guarantee from the government for foreign investors. As a result, foreign business, including the Taiwanese, prefers to invest in more stable and predictable regions. It is also worth mentioning that Russia imports many products from the PRC, some of which are in fact made at Taiwanese-owned operations. However, this trade is officially considered in the statistics as part of the Russian-PRC trade.

Over the past years, Russia has welcomed more than 300 Taiwanese students to work in the country, while Taiwan has allowed 200 Russian students. It is also said that around 1,000 Taiwanese visit Russia each year.

In 2022, Russia added Taiwan to the Unfriendly Countries List, which according to the Russian regime, commit "unfriendly actions" against its military invasion of Ukraine, despite Russia recognizing Taiwan as a part of China.

See also

Foreign relations of Russia
Foreign relations of Taiwan
China–Russia relations
Capture of Tanker Tuapse

References

Further reading
Hu, S. "Assessing Russia's Role in Cross-Taiwan Strait Relations," Issues & Studies, Vol. 43, No. 4 (December 2007): pp. 39–76.
Share, M.: Where Empires Collided: Russian and Soviet Relations with Hong Kong, Taiwan and Macau (Hong Kong: The Chinese University Press, 2007).

External links
Russia's Unofficial Relations with Taiwan
Taipei Times - COMMUNITY COMPASS: Russian-Taiwanese ties celebrated at Russian National Day party

 
Bilateral relations of Taiwan
Taiwan